Sailor Be Good is a 1933 American Pre-Code comedy film directed by James Cruze and written by Ethel Doherty, Viola Brothers Shore and Ralph Spence. Starring Jack Oakie, Vivienne Osborne, George E. Stone, Max Hoffman Jr. and Lincoln Stedman, the film was released on March 7, 1933, by RKO Pictures.

Plot

Cast
Jack Oakie as Kelsey Jones
Vivienne Osborne as Red Dale
George E. Stone as Murphy
Lincoln Stedman as Slim
Gertrude Michael as Kay Whitney
Huntley Gordon as Mr. Whitney
Charles Coleman as Butler

Trivia
Future pulp-writer and screenwriter, and ex-Navy man, Steve Fisher served as technical advisor and appeared on screen in an uncredited bit part.

References

External links
 

1933 films
American black-and-white films
1930s English-language films
Films directed by James Cruze
American comedy films
1933 comedy films
1930s American films